Megamorio is a genus of beetles in the family Carabidae, containing the following species:

 Megamorio basilewskyi Straneo, 1949
 Megamorio camerunus Straneo, 1949
 Megamorio congoensis Straneo, 1949
 Megamorio feai Straneo, 1938
 Megamorio gabonicus (Alluaud, 1932)
 Megamorio mniszechii (Chaudoir, 1869)

References

Pterostichinae